

Qualification system
A total of 88 athletes (44 men and 44 women) will qualify to compete at the games. A nation may enter a maximum of four athletes per gender. As host nation, Canada automatically qualifies a full team of eights athletes. All other athletes will qualify through the team world rankings as of February 26, 2015. The top ranked athlete/pair from each country in each event will have their points added together to get a country's total. The top three ranked will qualify eight athletes, the next four countries will qualify six each (three per gender) and the next four after that will qualify four each (two per gender). All other nations will qualify two athletes each (one per gender). Unranked nations may also request for quotas. If the entry total is more than 88 athletes, the continental federation will restrict team quotas to bring the total down to 88. If the total entry is less than 88, starting at the team ranked fourth will be given extra quotas (with a maximum of four per team).

Qualification summary

Qualification standings

Puerto Rico declined all four quotas it had earned (two in each gender), while Colombia also declined all two quotas it had earned (one quota in each gender). The Dominican Republic and Costa Rica declined one quota per gender. 
Guatemala, Argentina and Mexico each received one quota each additional per gender
Cuba receives an additional male quota, while Trinidad and Tobago receives an additional female quota.
Guyana received one quota per gender, after requesting quotas to the Pan American Badminton Federation as an unranked nation. 
Trinidad and Tobago later rejected both female quotas, and these two slots were not redistributed.
Canada declined two men's quotas, no athletes replaced them.
Costa Rica did not enter any athletes, and their quotas were not redistributed.

References

External links
BWF World Rankings as of February 26, 2015

P
P
Qualification for the 2015 Pan American Games
Badminton at the 2015 Pan American Games